Upper Hill is a neighbourhood of the city of Nairobi, the capital and largest city of Kenya. The district has seen an increase in major construction in recent years, with several multinational corporations setting up offices.

Location
The coordinates of Upper Hill are: 1°17'59.0"S, 36°48'58.0"E (Latitude:-1.299719; Longitude:36.816097).
Upper Hill lies in two major Nairobi City sub-counties; Kibra and Westlands. Ngong Road separates the two sub-counties.

Overview
Upper Hill was historically one of the residential neighbourhoods of the city of Nairobi, during colonial times. The  that comprise Upper Hill were majorly owned by Kenya Railways. During the 1990s and early 2000s, as land and office space became scarce and exorbitantly priced in the central business district, businesses relocated to Upper Hill and Westlands, where land and office space were more readily available and less expensive. Today, Upper Hill possesses a new modern skyline that is still being filled by modern skyscrapers of different and prestigious designs in the architectural world.

Economy

Spencon historically had its head office here, at Rahimtulla Tower.

Landmarks
In Upper Hill or near the boundaries of the suburb, there are several landmarks, including the following:
 Britam Tower, a 200-metre skyscraper that houses an insurance company. 
 UAP Old Mutual Tower, a 163-metre tower, the regional headquarters of UAP holdings.
 Prism Tower, a new upscale property along Ngong road.
 KCB towers, the new headquarters of KCB bank.
 Upper Hill District Association, an Association for Upper Hill
 The Kenyan regional offices of EMC Corporation
 Nairobi Hospital
The headquarters of the Kenyan Ministry of Health
 Nairobi Club Ground – An upscale private membership cricket club, with a clubhouse and cricket oval.
 The offices of the World Health Organization in Kenya
 Upper Hill School
 The British High Commission in Kenya
 The Kenyan headquarters of the African Development Bank
 The Kenyan headquarters of Citibank
 The Kenyan headquarters of DawaSwift
 The headquarters of Equity Group Holdings
 The Kenyan headquarters of NextChat
 The headquarters of Britam
 The headquarters of NCBA Group
 The headquarters of Zep-Re (PTA Reinsurance)
The headquarters of the Insurance Regulatory Authority
 The headquarters of Teacher Service Commission (TSC)
 The East African headquarters of Oxford University Press
 The Embassy of Japan
 The Embassy of Indonesia
 The Embassy of Israel
 The headquarters of UAP Group
 The headquarters of the Kenya Accountant and Secretaries National Examination Board (KASNEB)
 Institute of Certified Public Secretaries of Kenya (ICPSK)
 The Rahimtulla Tower, a twenty-two storey office skyscraper
 The Kenyan offices of the World Bank
 The Kenyan offices of the International Finance Corporation
 The headquarters of Victoria Commercial Bank, located in Victoria Towers on Kilimanjaro Avenue
 Kenya Commercial Bank Plaza (KCB Plaza) – Construction began in December 2010. Occupancy expected in 2013.

See also
 Rahimtulla Tower
 Abcon Complex & Towers
 Westlands
 Parklands, Nairobi
 Eastleigh, Nairobi

References

Populated places in Kenya
Cities in the Great Rift Valley
Suburbs of Nairobi